Peucaea is a genus of American sparrows. The species in this genus used to be included in the genus Aimophila.

Taxonomy and species
A molecular phylogenetic study published in 2009 found that the genus Aimophila was polyphyletic. In the resulting reorganization to create monophyletic genera, eight species were moved from Aimophila to the resurrected genus Peucaea. Peucaea had been introduced by the Franco-American ornithologist John James Audubon in 1839. The genus name is from the Ancient Greek peukē meaning "pine-tree". The type species was designated by English zoologist George Robert Gray in 1841 as Fringilla bachmani, a taxon now considered to be a subspecies of Bachman's sparrow with the trinomial name Peucaea aestivalis bachmani. Peucaea is the sister genus to Ammodramus within the family Passerellidae.

The genus contains the following 8 species:
 Rufous-winged sparrow, Peucaea carpalis
 Cinnamon-tailed sparrow, Peucaea sumichrasti
 Stripe-headed sparrow, Peucaea ruficauda
 Black-chested sparrow, Peucaea humeralis
 Bridled sparrow, Peucaea mystacalis
 Botteri's sparrow, Peucaea botterii
 Cassin's sparrow, Peucaea cassinii
 Bachman's sparrow, Peucaea aestivalis

Notes

References 

 
Bird genera
American sparrows
Taxa named by John James Audubon